The discography of Velvet Revolver, an American hard rock band, consists of two studio albums, one extended play (EP), 11 singles (nine as lead artist, two as featured artist), two video albums and eight music videos. Velvet Revolver was a supergroup formed in Rancho Santa Margarita, California in 2002 by former Guns N' Roses members Slash (lead guitar), Duff McKagan (bass) and Matt Sorum (drums), along with rhythm guitarist Dave Kushner (formerly of Wasted Youth) and late vocalist Scott Weiland (formerly and subsequently of Stone Temple Pilots).

The band signed with RCA Records the next year and released its debut album Contraband in 2004, which topped the US Billboard 200 and has since sold over 4 million copies in the US. The album was supported by the release of four singles, including "Slither" which topped the Billboard Alternative Songs and Mainstream Rock charts. In 2005 the group contributed the song "Come On, Come In" to the Fantastic Four soundtrack, which was also released as a single and reached number 14 on the Mainstream Rock chart. The band also performed on a recording of "Tears in Heaven" released to benefit victims of the 2004 Indian Ocean earthquake and tsunami.

Velvet Revolver returned in 2007 with Libertad. The band's second album reached number five on the Billboard 200, and was certified gold in Canada and silver in the UK. Lead single "She Builds Quick Machines" reached the top 20 of the Alternative Songs chart and number two on the Mainstream Rock chart. Weiland departed the band in April 2008, before RCA dropped the group later in the year. In 2010, Slash, McKagan and Sorum (credited as Velvet Revolver) were featured on Macy Gray's single "Kissed It". The band has since released two live video albums: Live in Houston in 2010 and Let It Roll: Live in Germany in 2012.

Studio albums

Extended plays

Singles

As featured artist

Videos

Video albums

Music videos

Footnotes

References

External links
Velvet Revolver at AllMusic
Velvet Revolver discography at Discogs
Velvet Revolver discography at MusicBrainz

Discography
Discographies of American artists
Rock music group discographies